This is a comparison of the various internal components and features of many smartphones.

Hardware and OS

2020s

2022

2021

2020

2010s

2019

2018

2017

2016

2015

2014

2013

2012

2011

2010

2000s

2009

2008

2007

2006

2005

2004

See also
DxOMark
Lists of mobile computers
List of BlackBerry products
Comparison of HTC devices
List of LG mobile phones
List of Motorola products#Mobile telephones
List of Nokia products
List of Palm OS devices
List of Sony Ericsson products
Comparison of Symbian devices
List of Windows Mobile devices

References

External links

Smartphones
Comparison